Jonathan Allen (born January 16, 1995) is an American football defensive tackle for the Washington Commanders of the National Football League (NFL). He played college football at Alabama, where he won several defensive player of the year awards during his 2016 season in addition to the 2016 College Football Playoff National Championship. Allen was drafted by Washington in the first round of the 2017 NFL Draft.

Early years
Allen was born in Anniston, Alabama, and lived in Seattle, North Carolina, South Carolina, Pittsburgh, and Maryland before settling down in Ashburn, Virginia, where he attended Stone Bridge High School. Allen's parents split up when he was three years old and his mother was granted custody of him and his brother, Richard Allen III. At the age of eight, both he and his brother were taken away by child protective services. Allen spent ten months in foster care before his father, US Army Sgt. 1st Class Richard Allen Jr., won full custody of him and his brother in 2004. As a senior in 2012, he was the Virginia Gatorade Football Player of the Year. During his career, he had 308 tackles and 44 sacks. Allen was a five-star recruit and was ranked amongst the top of his class. He committed to play college football for the University of Alabama.

College career
Allen played in 13 games as a true freshman at Alabama in 2013 and had 16 tackles. As a sophomore in 2014, he played in all 14 games and made 12 starts. He was named first-team All-SEC after recording 33 tackles and 5.5 sacks. As a junior in 2015, Allen started all 14 games for the Crimson Tide, who won the 2016 College Football Playoff National Championship over the Clemson Tigers by a score of 45–40. Allen went on to win the Bronko Nagurski Trophy, Chuck Bednarik Award, and Lombardi Award for his performance in the 2016 season.

College statistics

Professional career
Coming out of Alabama, Allen was projected to be a top five pick by some NFL draft experts. His stock began to decline after teams became concerned when he was diagnosed with arthritis in one of his shoulders and had surgery on both, two weeks before the combine. He was ranked as the top defensive tackle by Sports Illustrated, Pro Football Focus, and NFLDraftScout.com. ESPN ranked him the second best defensive lineman behind Myles Garrett. Even with the arthritis diagnosis, Allen was projected to be a first-round pick by analysts and scouts.

The Washington Redskins selected Allen in the first round, 17th overall, of the 2017 NFL Draft. He signed his four-year rookie contract, worth $11.59 million, on May 11, 2017. Allen recorded his first career sack in a Week 3 game against the Oakland Raiders. In Week 6, he suffered a Lisfranc injury against the San Francisco 49ers. He later underwent surgery and was placed on injured reserve on October 19, 2017.

Allen returned for the 2018 season and started all 16 games, recording eight sacks, 61 total tackles, and 15 quarterback hits. The team exercised the fifth-year option on his contract on April 27, 2020. After playing the defensive end position for the first three seasons of his career, Allen switched over to defensive tackle after the team's new defensive coordinator Jack Del Rio implemented a 4-3 defensive scheme.

On July 27, 2021, Allen signed a four-year contract extension worth $72 million.

On December 13, 2021, he was placed on the COVID-19 reserve list, but placed back on the active roster five days later. After recording a sack in the Week 15 game against the Philadelphia Eagles, he set a new career high of 8.5 sacks in a single-season. Allen punched teammate Daron Payne on the sideline during a blowout Monday Night Football loss to the Cowboys in Week 16. He was voted to the 2022 Pro Bowl, his first, following the season.

In Week 1 of the 2022 season, he recorded three tackles and a sack. Allen recorded his first career interception on Justin Fields and first career forced fumble in the Week 6 win over the Chicago Bears. In December 2022, he was voted into his second consecutive Pro Bowl.

NFL career statistics

Personal life
Allen married his wife, Hannah, in July 2018. Due to his own personal experience with the foster care system, Allen chose to work with Sasha Bruce Youthwork, a homeless shelter that focuses on helping young people in the Washington, D.C. area find safe homes.

References

External links
 
 Washington Commanders bio
 Alabama Crimson Tide bio

1995 births
Living people
African-American players of American football
Alabama Crimson Tide football players
All-American college football players
American football defensive ends
American football defensive tackles
People from Ashburn, Virginia
Players of American football from Virginia
Sportspeople from Anniston, Alabama
Sportspeople from the Washington metropolitan area
Washington Commanders players
Washington Football Team players
Washington Redskins players
21st-century African-American sportspeople
National Conference Pro Bowl players